On offshore oil platforms, conductor support systems, also known as conductor supported systems or satellite platforms, are small unmanned installations consisting of little more than a well bay, and a small process plant. They are designed to operate in conjunction with a static production platform which is connected to the platform by flow lines and/or by Umbilical cable.

Traditionally, these jacket-type  structures have been installed and used in shallow to medium water depths of up to 40 – 60 meters. The conductor supported system use its inherited strength of the well conductors to support both the wells and the topside structure.  

The conductor supported system is particularly suited to areas with more benign environmental conditions, however it is a common development option even in hurricane / cyclone prone areas such as the Gulf of Mexico or Australia's Carnarvon Basin. The well conductors act as both structural, weight-supporting piles and flowlines for the produced fluids from the well. These are drilled and installed with a drilling jackup rig using conventional drilling / lifting techniques.   

A leading proponent of this cost effective style of offshore development was Apache Energy which commissioned numerous Conductor Supported Wellhead Platforms in the Carnarvon Basin to feed its so called "String of Pearls" discoveries. 

Notably, in this Basin, the small field designs such as Conductor Supported Platforms and Monopods, often lay in proximity to the massive offshore Liquefied Natural Gas fields of the North West Shelf, Gorgon, Wheatstone and Pluto developments.

References

Oil platforms